Empress Ren (personal name unknown) was an empress of the Di-led Cheng Han dynasty of China. Her husband was the founding emperor Li Xiong (Emperor Wu).

She was created empress by Li Xiong in 315. She was sonless, and although Li Xiong had sons by concubines, he chose his nephew Li Ban (Emperor Ai), whom she raised, to be his crown prince. After Li Xiong died in 334, Li Ban became emperor and honored her as empress dowager. Less than a year later, Li Ban was assassinated by Li Xiong's son Li Yue (李越), who subsequently made another son of Li Xiong, Li Qi, whom Empress Dowager Ren had also raised, emperor. Li Yue forged an edict from Empress Dowager Ren to legitimize his actions.

During Li Qi's reign, she continued as empress dowager. When Li Qi was overthrown by Li Shou (Emperor Zhaowen) in 338, Li Shou forged an edict from Empress Dowager Ren as well to legitimize his actions, implying that she was still alive at that point, but there was no more mention of her in history from that point on. It is not known when she died.

References 

Cheng Han empresses
3rd-century births
4th-century deaths